Tahani Abdalla Attia Gasmalla is the Minister of Science and Communication of Sudan and an associate professor in the faculty of engineering at the University of Khartoum.

Education
Attia Gasmalla has a B.Sc., M.Sc., and Ph.D. from the University of Khartoum.

References

Living people
1969 births
Sudanese politicians
Academic staff of the University of Khartoum
University of Khartoum alumni